ORCA is an ab initio quantum chemistry program package that contains modern electronic structure methods including density functional theory, many-body perturbation, coupled cluster, multireference methods, and semi-empirical quantum chemistry methods. Its main field of application is larger molecules, transition metal complexes, and their spectroscopic properties. ORCA is developed in the research group of Frank Neese. The free version is available only for academic use at academic institutions.

Graphic interfaces 
 Avogadro
 Chemcraft
 Molden
 Ascalaph Designer
 Gabedit

See also 
 Orca (assistive technology)
 List of quantum chemistry and solid-state physics software

References

External links 
 

Computational chemistry software
Quantum chemistry